Mount Michelson may refer to:

 Mount Michelson (Brooks Range) in the Brooks Range of Alaska, USA
 Mount Michelson (Chugach Mountains) in the Chugach Mountains of Alaska, USA